The 2022 Organization of Turkic States summit, officially the Meeting of the Council of Heads of State of the Organization of Turkic States summit, was a meeting between the leaders of the Organization of Turkic States in Samarkand, Uzbekistan, on 11 November 2022.

Background 
It was the first summit after the transformation of the Turkic Council into the Organization of Turkic States.

Prior to the summit, two separate meetings were held in Uzbekistan by the ministers of economy and ministers of foreign affairs

Summit 
The summit adopted the organization's strategic action plan for the next five years. The main agenda topics among others were the decisions and signing of the protocol on amendments to the Nakhchivan Agreement, the Trade Facilitation Strategy of the Organization of Turkic States, the Agreement on Establishment of Simplified Customs Corridor, the Agreement on International Combined Freight Transport, Transport Connectivity Program, the Memorandum of Understanding Between Relevant Institutions of the Member States of the Organization of Turkic States About Digital Human Resources Systems, and Trade Facilitation Strategy of the Organization of Turkic States. During the meeting, the leaders also discussed recent regional and international developments.

One of the key decisions of the Summit was the establishment of the Turkic Investment Fund which aims to provide the necessary resources for the economies of member states and observer states and help build a more integrated Turkic financial system.

During the summit, Turkish President Recep Tayyip Erdoğan and former Turkmen President Gurbanguly Berdimuhamedow were awarded with the Supreme Order of Turkic World.

Northern Cyprus was granted the status of observer.

Participants

See also 

 Politics of Asia
 Politics of Europe

References 

2022 conferences
2022 in Uzbekistan
2022 in international relations
21st-century diplomatic conferences
Diplomatic conferences in Uzbekistan
November 2022 events in Asia
Organization of Turkic States summits